Phuket Rajabhat University (PKRU; , pronounced: raj-cha-pat-pu-get) is a university in Thailand.

External links
 (in English)
  (in Thai)

Educational institutions established in 1971
Universities in Thailand
1971 establishments in Thailand